Protein SMG7 is a protein that in humans is encoded by the SMG7 gene.

References

Further reading